Sciocoris is a genus of shield bugs belonging to the family Pentatomidae, subfamily Pentatominae. The genus was erected by Carl Fredrik Fallén in 1829.

Subgenera and species
Subgenus Aposciocoris Wagner, 1965
 Sciocoris cerrutii Wagner, 1959
 Sciocoris homalonotus Fieber, 1851
 Sciocoris luteolus Fieber, 1861
 Sciocoris macrocephalus Fieber, 1851
 Sciocoris microphthalmus Flor, 1860
 Sciocoris umbrinus (Wolff, 1804)
Subgenus Masthletinus Reuter, 1879

Subgenus Neosciocoris Wagner, 1965
 Sciocoris conspurcatus Klug, 1845
 Sciocoris fumipennis Puton, 1881
 Sciocoris maculatus Fieber, 1851
 Sciocoris pallens Klug, 1845
 Sciocoris sideritidis Wollaston, 1858
Subgenus Parasciocoris Wagner, 1965

Subgenus Sciocoris Fallén, 1829
 Sciocoris cursitans (Fabricius, 1794)
 Sciocoris distinctus Fieber, 1851
 Sciocoris galiberti Ribaut, 1926
 Sciocoris helferi Fieber, 1851
 Sciocoris ribauti Wagner, 1953
 Sciocoris sulcatus Fieber, 1851
 Sciocoris angularis Puton, 1889
 Sciocoris angusticollis Puton, 1895
 Sciocoris assimilis Fieber, 1851
 Sciocoris brevicollis Fieber, 1851
 Sciocoris canariensis Lindberg, 1953
 Sciocoris consobrinus Kiritshenko, 1952
 Sciocoris deltocephalus Fieber, 1861
 Sciocoris hoberlandti Wagner, 1954
 Sciocoris longifrons Barber, 1933
 Sciocoris ochraceus Fieber, 1861
 Sciocoris orientalis Linnavuori, 1960
 Sciocoris pentheri Wagner, 1953
 Sciocoris reflexus Fieber, 1851

References

 Rider, D. A. (2004). "Family Pentatomidae". Catalogue of the Heteroptera of the Palaearctic Region.

External links
 BioLib
 Fauna Europaea

Sciocorini
Pentatomidae genera